Taijiang may refer to:

Taijiang County, in Guizhou, China
Taijiang District, in Fuzhou, Fujian, China